Leslie Denis Swindale (16 March 1928 - 25 September 2022) was a New Zealand-born soil scientist, agriculturist, writer and a former chairman of the Department Agronomy and Soil Science of the University of Hawaii. He was the author of several books on soil and agricultural sciences and was a part of the Freedom from Hunger Campaign of the Food and Agriculture Organization. He was a Fellow of New Zealand Institute of Chemistry, American Society of Agronomy and a foreign fellow of the National Academy of Agricultural Sciences. The Government of India awarded him the third highest civilian honour of the Padma Bhushan, in 1991, for his contributions to science, making him one of the few non-Indians to receive the award.

Biography  
Swindale was born to Anne Walder and Ernest Swindale on 16 March 1928 in Wellington. He completed his graduate (1948) and master's (1950) degrees at Victoria University, Wellington before securing a doctoral degree from the University of Wisconsin in 1955. He started his career as a physical chemist at the New Zealand Soil Bureau and held several notable positions which included Director of New Zealand Pottery and Ceramics Research Association, Lower Hutt (1960–1963), Professor and chairman of department of agronomy and soil science at the University of Hawaii (1963–1968), Chief of Soil Resources Development and Consultant with the Food and Agriculture Organization (1968–1970), Associate director of Hawaii Agricultural Experimental Station, Honolulu (1970–1976), Director General of the International Crops Research Institute for the Semi-Arid Tropics, Patancheru, India (1977–1989) before becoming the Chairman of the Consultative Group on International Agricultural Research at Patancheru (1989–1990) He was the author of several books on soil and agricultural sciences and was a part of the Freedom from Hunger Campaign of the Food and Agriculture Organization. He is a Fellow of New Zealand Institute of Chemistry, American Society of Agronomy and the National Academy of Agricultural Sciences and a member of institutions and societies such as Society for International Development, Soil Science Society of America, International Union of Soil Sciences, New Zealand Society of Soil Science, Royal Society of New Zealand, New Zealand Geological Society, Indian Society of Soil Science, Clay Mineral Society of India and Gamma Sigma Delta. In 1991, he became one of among the few foreign nationals to be honored by the Government of India, when he was selected for the third highest civilian honour of the Padma Bhushan, for his contributions to science.

Swindale was married to Delle Sprinza Natelson and the couple had two sons and a daughter.

He died at his home in Honolulu on 25 September 2022, aged 94.

Selected bibliography

See also 

 Consultative Group on International Agricultural Research
 International Crops Research Institute for the Semi-Arid Tropics
 List of University of Wisconsin–Madison people
 List of University of Hawaii alumni

References 

Recipients of the Padma Bhushan in science & engineering
1928 births
2022 deaths
People from Wellington City
Victoria University of Wellington alumni
University of Wisconsin–Madison alumni
University of Hawaiʻi faculty
Food and Agriculture Organization officials
Fellows of the National Academy of Agricultural Sciences
New Zealand soil scientists
New Zealand academics
New Zealand officials of the United Nations